Now That's What I Call Music! 3, also referred to as Now 3, was released on September 1, 1997. The album is the third edition of the Asia Now That's What I Call Music! series. It was awarded double platinum in Japan.

South Asia edition track listing
 Hanson – "MMMBop" (3:59)
 Spice Girls – "2 Become 1" (4:00)
 Wet Wet Wet – "Fool for Your Love"
 Backstreet Boys – "Everybody (Backstreet's Back)" (3:45)
 No Doubt – "Don't Speak" (4:23)
 R. Kelly – "I Believe I Can Fly" (4:43)
 Bee Gees – "Alone" (4:21)
 The Cardigans – "Lovefool" (3:18)
 U2 – "Staring at the Sun" (4:37)
 George Michael – "Star People" (Forthright Edit) (4:29)
 OMC – "How Bizarre" (3:46)
 Sheryl Crow – "If It Makes You Happy" (4:32)
 Boyzone – "Words" (4:02)
 Code Red – "This Is Our Song" (4:01)
 Kavana – "MFEO" (3:32)
 Richard Marx – "Until I Find You Again" (4:19)
 Michael Learns to Rock – "Breaking My Heart" (4:04)
 911 – "The Day We Find Love" (4:09)

Indonesian & Malaysian edition track listing
 Hanson – "MMMBop" (3:59)
 Spice Girls – "2 Become 1" (4:00)
 Wet Wet Wet – "If I Never See You Again" (3:49)
 Backstreet Boys – "Everybody (Backstreet's Back)" (3:45)
 No Doubt – "Don't Speak" (4:23)
 R. Kelly – "I Believe I Can Fly" (4:43)
 Bee Gees – "Alone" (4:21)
 The Cardigans – "Lovefool" (3:18)
 U2 – "Staring at the Sun" (4:37)
 George Michael – "Star People" (Forthright Edit) (4:29)
 OMC – "How Bizarre" (3:46)
 Sheryl Crow – "If It Makes You Happy" (4:32)
 Boyzone – "Words" (4:02)
 Code Red – "This Is Our Song" (4:01)
 Kavana – "MFEO" (3:32)
 Richard Marx – "Until I Find You Again" (4:19)
 Michael Learns to Rock – "Breaking My Heart" (4:04)
 911 – "The Day We Find Love" (4:09)

Sales and certifications

References

External links
 Now That's What I Call Music! 3 Asia Track List
 Now That's What I Call Music! 3 Indonesia Track List
 Now That's What I Call Music! 3 China Track List

1997 compilation albums
Now That's What I Call Music! albums (Asian series)